Douglas John Malin (14 February 1928 – 1 January 2021), known professionally as Mark Eden, was an English actor. He was best known for his portrayal of villainous Alan Bradley in Coronation Street from 1986 to 1989.

Early life
Mark Eden was born Douglas John Malin in St Pancras, London, England on 14 February 1928.

Career
As Mark Eden, he appeared at the Royal Court Theatre and in repertory theatre in England and Wales. His television and film roles include the Doctor Who serial Marco Polo (1964) in which he played Marco Polo, a reporter in Quatermass and the Pit in 1958, Number 100 in The Prisoner in 1967, and Inspector Parker in the TV adaptations of several Lord Peter Wimsey stories in the 1970s. Having briefly played a short lived character named Wally Randle in 1981, he returned for a long-running role in Coronation Street, in which he played Alan Bradley.

Eden's time in Coronation Street came to an end in December 1989 after Bradley was killed by a Blackpool tram. In 2009, Eden unveiled a plaque at the tram stop where the scene was filmed.

After leaving Coronation Street, Eden said he received many casting offers for "psycho" roles. Before the show, Eden had often been cast in the role of an upper-class gentleman. Eden worked on the stage and in radio plays. He also worked with the Beach Boys and wrote a musical about them. His television appearances included playing Boucher in an episode of Poirot. His autobiography Who's Going to Look at You? was published in 2010.

Personal life
Eden was married three times. His first wife was Joan Long, whom he married in 1953. Their son, David (1957–2017), also became an actor; and David's daughter (Eden's granddaughter) Emma Griffiths Malin (born 1980) is also an actress. Eden and Joan divorced in 1959, and Joan later married the actor John Le Mesurier.

In 1971, he married Diana W. Smith, whom he had met that year; she later acted under the name Diana Eden. She was eighteen years his junior. They had a daughter named Polly. In 1993, Eden married Sue Nicholls, his co-star in Coronation Street and the daughter of Lord Harmar-Nicholls. They remained married until Eden's death.

Eden suffered from Alzheimer's disease in later life, and was admitted to hospital with the disease in November 2020. He died on 1 January 2021, aged 92.

Filmography

Film

Television

References

External links

1928 births
2021 deaths
20th-century English male actors
21st-century English male actors
Deaths from dementia in England
Deaths from Alzheimer's disease
English male film actors
English male soap opera actors
Male actors from London